Séverin Tapé Zogbo  is an Ivorian football defender who played for Ivory Coast in the 1980 African Cup of Nations.

External links
11v11 Profile

Ivorian footballers
Ivory Coast international footballers
Living people
1980 African Cup of Nations players
Association football defenders
Year of birth missing (living people)